Anna D'Angeri (Angermayer de Redenburg) (14 April 1853 – 14 December 1907) was an Austrian-born opera singer, who made Italy her adopted country and Italianized her surname. She had a brief (1873–1881) but eminent career singing leading soprano roles at the Vienna Hofoper and La Scala, Milan. Particularly admired by Verdi, she sang the role of Amelia in the premiere of the revised version of his Simon Boccanegra. She also sang the roles of Ortrud and Venus in the London premiere of Wagner's Lohengrin and Tannhäuser and created the roles of Jefte in Ponchielli's Il figliuol prodigo and Maria in Gomes's Maria Tudor.

References

Austrian operatic sopranos
Italian operatic sopranos
1853 births
1907 deaths
Musicians from Vienna
19th-century Italian  women opera singers